Charles A. Curtze (April 8, 1911 – December 26, 2007) was a rear admiral in the United States Navy. He was born in Erie, Pennsylvania and died at age 96 in Millcreek Township, Pennsylvania. He served as Deputy Chief of the Navy's Bureau of Ships during the Vietnam War. He is buried at the Erie Cemetery.

Education
Curtze participated in a Rotary Club student exchange to Scandinavia, which led to his appointment to the United States Naval Academy. Curtze was a star gymnast while attending the Naval Academy, winning second place in 1931 in the Eastern Intercollegiate Gymnastics League and leading the midshipmen to the league's championship in 1933. When he qualified for the US gymnastics team attending the 1936 Summer Olympics, his position with the US Navy caused the State Department to prohibit his travel to Berlin, Germany during Adolf Hitler's rule. Curtze graduated from the Naval Academy in 1933. He received his Master's degree in Naval Construction from the Massachusetts Institute of Technology.

Career
Curtze was serving as a fleet safety officer aboard the cruiser USS St. Louis at the time of the attack on Pearl Harbor on December 7, 1941. He helped guide the ship safely out of harbor, making it one of the few major ships to escape the Japanese bombings. He served with the North Atlantic Treaty Organization (NATO) as the engineering member of the first US team in London. He also served as commander of the San Francisco Naval Shipyard. Curtze and his commanding officer, Rear Admiral William A. Brockett, Chief of the Bureau of Ships, resigned their posts in 1965 to protest Secretary of Defense Robert S. McNamara's centralization of the U.S. Department of Defense.

See also

References

Obituary, Erie Times-News, December 27, 2007
Admiral Explains Why He Resigned; Tells Superiors He Opposes Pentagon Centralization, New York Times, October 28, 1965
2 Admirals Quit Posts In Protest Over M'Namara; Chief of the Bureau of Ships and Deputy Are Critical of Increasing Centralization, New York Times, October 27, 1965
Here and There in Various Fields of Sport, New York Times, April 10, 1932
Jochim Made Comeback; Veteran Regained National All-Around Crown In Gymnastics, New York Times, December 31, 1933

United States Navy admirals
United States Navy personnel of World War II
People from Erie, Pennsylvania
1911 births
2007 deaths
Military personnel from Pennsylvania